Stephen Jacob (December 7, 1755 – January 27, 1817) (his last name is sometimes spelled "Jacobs", and his birth date is sometimes incorrectly given as 1754) was an attorney, politician, and judge during Vermont's years as an independent republic and the early years of its statehood.  He served as a Justice of the Vermont Supreme Court from 1801 to 1802.

Biography
Stephen Jacob was born in Sheffield, Massachusetts on December 7, 1755, the son of Richard and Thankful Jacob.  He attended Dartmouth College, graduated from Yale University in 1778, and then relocated to Vermont.  He first attracted public notice in August 1778, when he read a poem he had composed at a ceremony to commemorate the first anniversary of the Battle of Bennington.

Jacob studied law with Theodore Sedgwick, settled in Windsor, Vermont in 1780, and attained admission to the bar.  He joined the militia during the American Revolution, and served in the company commanded by Captain John Mercy during a three-day mobilization in March 1781.  The militia in eastern Vermont had been called out by General Jacob Bayley of Newbury in response to a report of British troops from Canada operating in the Newbury area, but the report proved unfounded.

Jacob practiced law in Vermont, and became active in politics and government, including service as town meeting moderator, selectman, lister, and justice of the peace.  Among the other offices he held were: member of the Vermont House of Representatives (1781, 1788, 1794); Clerk of the House (1788, 1789); member of the Council of Censors (1785) (The Council of Censors met every seven years to review actions of the governor and executive council and the legislature to ensure their constitutionality); and State's Attorney of Windsor County (1786).

While Jacob was State's Attorney, an anti-tax protest took place in Windsor, inspired in large part by Shays' Rebellion; Jacob and Sheriff Benjamin Wait were able to mobilize 70 members of the local militia, who forced the protesters to end their demonstration and return to their homes.

In 1789 Vermont and New York created a commission to settle their longstanding dispute over land titles in preparation for Vermont's admission to the Union as the 14th state, and Jacob served as one of the commissioners.  When Vermont was admitted to the Union in 1791, Jacob was appointed the first United States Attorney for the District of Vermont; he served until 1794, when he was succeeded by Amos Marsh.  Jacob was a delegate to the 1793 state constitutional convention, and chief judge of the Windsor County court in 1791, and from 1797 to 1801.  He was a member of the Governor's Council from 1796 to 1802, a trustee of Middlebury College from 1800 to 1810, and a Dartmouth College trustee from 1802 until his death.  He served as a justice of the Vermont Supreme Court from 1801 to 1802.

Slavery case
During Vermont's early history a small number of African American individuals seem to have been illegally bought and sold by some of its white settlers.  Despite Vermont's constitutional prohibition against involuntary servitude, these individuals appear to have been de facto slaves.  In 1783, Jacob purchased from Jotham White of Charlestown, New Hampshire a black woman named Dinah, who was about 30 years old.  In 1801, the selectmen of Windsor sued Jacob, claiming that Dinah (sometimes called Dinah Mason or Dinah White in recent years) was too sick to work.  She then fell under the care of the selectmen in their capacity as overseers of the poor, and they took Jacob to court in an effort to recover the public money they had spent on her care.

Jacob presided over the trial, which was held in the Windsor County Court.  His lawyers argued that the case should be dismissed because the court summons he had been served was presented by a deputy sheriff, who could be considered a plaintiff, and plaintiffs were legally prohibited from carrying out such activities.  The other judges on the court, Assistant Judges Elijah Robinson and Jesse Williams, found in his favor and awarded him court costs.

The town of Windsor then appealed to the Vermont Supreme Court; Jacob was a Justice at the time, and recused himself from hearing the case.  The attorneys for the town presented a copy of Jacob's 1783 bill of sale and receipt for the transaction involving Dinah, and argued that she was a de facto slave, which made Jacob liable for her support.  Jacob's attorneys argued that since slavery was illegal in Vermont, Jacob could not be considered Dinah's owner, and was therefore not responsible to support her.  In addition, his attorneys argued that certain residents of Windsor had in fact hired Dinah away from Jacob's household, and that she had worked for them after having worked for Jacob, which made them liable for Dinah's support.  The court ruled that the bill of sale was not admissible as evidence because slavery violated the state constitution; as a result, Dinah was considered not to have been a slave, and Jacob not to have been her master, so he was not liable for her support.  The judges again awarded Jacob court costs.  Dinah died in 1809.

Death and burial
Jacob continued to practice law in Windsor until his death there on January 27, 1817.  (Some sources including his gravestone incorrectly indicate 1816.)  He was buried at Old South Church Cemetery in Windsor.

Family
In 1779, Jacob married Pamela Farrand; they were the parents of:

Laura L. (1780–1826)
Harriet Pamela (1781–1857), the wife of Samuel W. Fitch
Richard Henry (1784–1791)
Maria (1791–1821), the wife of Army Surgeon Walter V. Wheaton
Frances (1794–1797)
Daniel Farrand (1802–1802)

Daniel Farrand, who also served on the Vermont Supreme Court, was Jacob's brother-in-law.

Legacy
Jacob's Windsor home, called the Stephen Jacob House, is owned by Historic Windsor, Inc./Preservation Education Institute.  It has been the subject of preservation efforts since 2008.

References

Sources

Books

Magazines

Internet

Newspapers

1755 births
1817 deaths
People from Sheffield, Massachusetts
People from Windsor, Vermont
Yale University alumni
U.S. state supreme court judges admitted to the practice of law by reading law
People of pre-statehood Vermont
People of Vermont in the American Revolution
Vermont lawyers
State's attorneys in Vermont
Members of the Vermont House of Representatives
Vermont state court judges
Justices of the Vermont Supreme Court
Burials in Vermont
19th-century American lawyers